El Lindero is a village and municipality in Catamarca Province in northwestern Argentina.

References

Populated places in Catamarca Province